Sarkis may refer to:
 Sarkis, Iran, a village in West Azerbaijan Province, Iran
 Saint Sarkis the Warrior, a saint of the 4th century
 Patriarch Sarkis of Jerusalem (disambiguation), three Armenian patriarchs, from the 13th to 16th centuries
Patriarch Sarkis I of Jerusalem (r. 1281–1313)
Patriarch Sarkis II of Jerusalem (r. 1394–1415)
Patriarch Sarkis III of Jerusalem (r. 1507–1517)
Sarkis I of Armenia, Catholicos of the Armenian Apostolic Church between 992 and 1019 
Sarkis II the Relic-Carrier, Catholicos of the Armenian Apostolic Church between 1469 and 1474.
 Aïbeg and Serkis, 13th century Mongol envoys

Saint Sarkis / Mar Sarkis
Saint Sarkis also known as Saint Sergius -- see Saints Sergius and Bacchus
The Church of Saint Sarkis, Tekor known as Tekor Basilica, a 5th-century Armenian church built in historical Armenia, now in the town of Digor in the Kars Province of Turkey
Mar Sarkis, a number of churches and monasteries
Monastery of Mar Sarkis and Bakhos, Tourza, North Lebanon
Mar Sarkis, Ehden, the monastery of Mar Sarkis, Ehden, Lebanon (known also as Mar Sarkis, Ras Al Nahr)
Monastery of Mar Sarkis - Bsharri, Lebanon, transformed into the Gibran Museum
Monastery of Mar Sarkis, Maaloula, Syria
Monastery of Little Hagia Sophia, Istanbul, Turkey
Saint Sarkis Cathedral, Tehran, Iran
Saint Sarkis Cathedral, Yerevan, Armenia
Saint Sargis Church of Ashtarak, Armenia
St. Sarkis Church (Dearborn, Michigan), USA
Saint Sarkis Church, Nor Nork, Armenia
Saint Sargis Monastery of Ushi, Armenia

People

First name
Sarkis Acopian (1926–2007), inventor, industrialist, environmentalist, and humanitarian
Sarkis Aghajan Mamendo (born 1962), Iraqi Assyrian politician and government minister in Iraqi Kurdistan 
Sarkis Assadourian (born 1948), Armenian-Canadian politician and MP in the Canadian Parliament (House of Commons)
Sarkis Assadourian (fencer) (born 1948), Iranian-Armenian fencer
Serkis Diranian (1854–1918), Armenian orientalist painter
Sarkis Djanbazian (1913-1963), Iranian-Armenian artist
Sarkis Hayrapetyan (born 1992), Armenian figure skater
Sarkis Ordyan (1918–2003), Ukrainian-Armenian painter 
Sarkis Soghanalian (1929–2011), nicknamed Merchant of Death, an international private arms dealer
Sarkis Zabunyan better known as just Sarkis, Armenian-Turkish-French conceptual artist
Sarkis Zeitlian (died 1985), Lebanese Armenian politician and journalist

Family name
Abe Sarkis (1913–1991), American mobster (Boston)
Andy Serkis (born 1964), English actor and film director 
Angela Sarkis (born 1955), American businesswoman
Elias Sarkis, President of Lebanon from 1976 to 1982
Inanna Sarkis (born 1993), Assyrian-Bulgarian YouTuber
Joseph Sarkis (born 1949), Lebanese politician and government minister
Hashim Sarkis (born 1964), Lebanese architect
Stephanie Moulton Sarkis, specialist in the treatment of ADD/ADHD and medical writer

See also
Sarki (disambiguation)
Sargis
Sarkies (disambiguation)
Sergius (disambiguation)
 Serge (given name)